The Saltley Gate Peace Group, is an inner city interfaith organisation based in Birmingham, England.

Background
The Saltley Gate Peace Group (SGPG) was initially formed as a joint Christian/Muslim peace initiative in response to the threat of war in Iraq as a part of the growing peace movement in Britain following 9/11.

The group played an active role supporting the Stop the War Coalition in the city and encouraged local activism through a united faith-based front.

It continues to participate in the anti-war establishment along with its other work.

Community
The SGPG has since become more community based, working with various authorities to ensure a better quality of public service for residents in the more deprived areas of Birmingham.

The organisation also takes a tough stance on vandalism, racism and crime and encourages inter-religious dialogue. It works closely with Birmingham Citizens and the Birmingham Quaker-Muslim Peace and Social Justice Group.

Campaigns
Amongst its causes has been working with faith leaders to prevent the promotion of glorification of terrorism amongst younger Muslims in the inner city.

In 2005, the SGPG also called on the West Midlands Police to ban the flying of Pakistani flags in the city during the festival of Eid to prevent racial tensions. This followed a similar ban enforced in London.

In January 2007, the group publicly supported the city's Green Lane Mosque against accusations of extremism, made in the Channel 4 documentary Undercover Mosque.

Founders
The Saltley Gate Peace Group was founded by Methodist minister Simon Topping and community activist Adam Yosef in 2003.

The organisation is currently based at the Saltley Methodist Church in the West Midlands and is supported by Reverend Chris Shannahan, founder of youth programme Yeast in the City.

Sources
Police hunt killer of Birmingham stab victim – Birmingham Mail, March 2009
Man, 20, 'critical' after shooting in shop – Birmingham Post, February 2008
Man gunned down in shop – Birmingham Mail, February 2008
Anger over anti-British hate posters – Birmingham Mail, May 2007
Birmingham's Muslims fear reprisals after anti-terror raids – The Independent, February 2007
Birmingham rocked by terror raids – The Asian Today, February 2007
Terror arrests anger community – BBC News, February 2007
Communities must unite – Birmingham Post, February 2007
Terror arrests: A call for calm – Birmingham Post, February 2007
Community leaders fear raids could be 'damaging – Birmingham Mail, February 2007
Channel 4 accused of creating mischief over portrayal of Black Muslim in Dispatches documentary Black Britain, January 2007
Channel 4 Blasted for Demonising Muslims MD News, January 2007
Mosque launches probe after TV claims Birmingham Mail, January 2007
Faces behind the faith – BBC Birmingham, July 2005
 City outrage over pro-Osama poster Evening Mail, September 2004
 Muslim leaders outraged by bin Laden posters Birmingham Post, September 2004
 Mission alongside the poor The Methodist Church of Great Britain, 2003/2004

Community organisations in Birmingham, West Midlands
Christian and Islamic interfaith dialogue
Religion in Birmingham, West Midlands